The Horsemen's Track is a horse racing complex under construction in Padre Garcia, Batangas, Philippines. It is owned and to be operated by the Hapi Jockey Club.

Background
The construction of The Horsemen's Track was followed by the granting of a 25-year franchise to the Hapi Jockey Club, Inc. (HJCI) by the Philippine government through Republic Act 11649 which took effect in March 2022. The franchise allowed the jockey club to operate race tracks in Batangas, Laguna and Cavite. Groundbreaking for The Horsemen's Track in Padre Garcia, Batangas took place on May 3, 2022. The venue is projected to open in 2024.

Facilities
The Horsemen's Track will be patterned after the Churchill Downs in Louisville, United States which will reportedly be a departure from other race tracks in the Philippines. It will be built on a  land.

References

Horse racing venues in the Philippines
Sports in Batangas
Horse racing in the Philippines
Buildings and structures in Batangas
Sports complexes in the Philippines